Thoulcanna County is one of the 141 Cadastral divisions of New South Wales. It is located south of the border with Queensland, to the west of the Paroo River near Wanaaring in the Bourke Shire.

The name Thoulcanna is believed to be derived from a local Aboriginal word and is also the name of the local Thoulcanna Station.

Parishes within this county
A full list of parishes found within this county; their current LGA and mapping coordinates to the approximate centre of each location is as follows:

References

Counties of New South Wales